The 1936 United States House of Representatives elections were elections for the United States House of Representatives to elect members to serve in the 75th United States Congress. They were held for the most part on November 3, 1936, while Maine held theirs on September 14. They coincided with President Franklin D. Roosevelt's landslide re-election. Roosevelt's Democratic Party gained twelve net seats from the Republican Party, bringing them above a three-fourths majority. This was the largest majority since Reconstruction, as the last time a party won so decisively was in 1866. This is the last time any party held 3/4ths of all House seats. 

Significant representation from the Progressives of Wisconsin and Farmer–Labor Party of Minnesota is also seen, as these two liberal populist groups gained a foothold.

The 1936 elections showed the continuing trust for the American people in that Roosevelt would guide the nation from depression. Despite setbacks, the people had faith in the New Deal and elected leaders who supported its measures. This was the last of four straight election losses for Republicans due to the lingering effects of the Depression.

Overall results 

Source: Election Statistics – Office of the Clerk

Special elections

Alabama

Arizona

Arkansas

California

Colorado

Connecticut

Delaware

Florida

Georgia

Idaho

Illinois

Indiana

Iowa

Kansas

Kentucky

Louisiana

Maine

Maryland

Massachusetts

Michigan

Minnesota

Mississippi

Missouri

Montana

Nebraska

Nevada

New Hampshire 

In the 1st district, Republican Arthur B. Jenks was initially declared the winner, and sat in the House from January 1937 to June 1938, but Democrat Alphonse Roy successfully contested the election and served the remainder of the term before losing the 1938 election to Jenks.

New Jersey

New Mexico

New York

North Carolina

North Dakota

Ohio

Oklahoma

Oregon

Pennsylvania

Rhode Island

South Carolina

South Dakota

Tennessee

Texas

Utah

Vermont

Virginia

Washington

West Virginia

Wisconsin

Wyoming

Non-voting delegates

Alaska Territory 

Alaska Territory elected its non-voting delegate September 8, 1936.

See also 
 1936 United States elections
 1936 United States Senate elections
 1936 United States presidential election
 74th United States Congress
 75th United States Congress

Notes

References